DVP may refer to:
 decessit vita patris, "died in the lifetime of his father", term used by genealogists to denote a child who pre-deceased his or her father and did not live long enough to inherit the father's title or estate.
 Delivery versus payment, a common form of settlement for securities
  (German People's Party), a political party in the German Weimar Republic
 Several other parties named German People's Party (disambiguation)
 Don Valley Parkway, a municipal expressway in Toronto
 Dover Priory railway station, in the United Kingdom (Network Rail station code)
 Democrats and Veterans, a political party in the United Kingdom.
 NASCAR's Damaged Vehicle Policy 
 Double vaginal penetration, a variant of group sex

See also
 Non-DVP, a form of securities settlement